Steven Ronald Bochco (December 16, 1943 – April 1, 2018) was an American television writer and producer. He developed a number of television series, including Hill Street Blues, L.A. Law, Doogie Howser, M.D., Cop Rock, and NYPD Blue.

Early life
Bochco was born to a Jewish family in New York City, the son of Mimi, a painter, and Rudolph Bochco, a concert violinist and Polish immigrant. He was educated in Manhattan at the High School of Music and Art. His elder sister is actress Joanna Frank.

In 1961, he enrolled at Carnegie Institute of Technology (now known as Carnegie Mellon University after merging with the Mellon Institute in 1967) in Pittsburgh to study playwriting and theater. He graduated with a Bachelor of Fine Arts (BFA) in Theater in 1966, having also had an MCA Writing Fellowship.

Career

Bochco went to work for Universal Pictures as a writer and then story editor on Ironside, Columbo, McMillan & Wife, and the short-lived Lorne Greene and Ben Murphy series, Griff, as well as Delvecchio and The Invisible Man.

He wrote the story and teleplay for the Columbo episode "Murder by the Book" (1971), and the teleplays for several other episodes. He wrote the screenplay for the 1968 film The Counterfeit Killer and worked on Silent Running (1972) and Double Indemnity (1973). He left Universal in 1978 to go to MTM Enterprises where he had greater scope for producing. His first effort there was the short-lived CBS police drama Paris, notable as the first series on which James Earl Jones played a lead role.

He achieved major success for NBC with the police drama Hill Street Blues. It ran from 1981 to 1987 and Bochco was credited as co-creator along with Michael Kozoll, also writing and producing. The series also garnered considerable critical acclaim and many awards, and was nominated for a total of 98 Emmy Awards throughout its run. Bochco was fired from MTM in 1985 following the failure of Bay City Blues (1983).

Bochco moved to 20th Century Fox where he co-created and produced L.A. Law (1986–94) which aired on NBC. This series was also widely acclaimed and a regular award winner. In 1987, Bochco co-created the half-hour dramedy Hooperman which starred John Ritter but was canceled after two seasons, despite Bochco offering to take over direct day-to-day control of a third season. Hooperman was part of a lucrative deal with ABC in 1987 to create and produce ten new television series, which prompted Bochco to form Steven Bochco Productions. That year, Bochco was in final talks with an exclusive agreement with CBS or ABC, and ABC reportedly being the winning bid. From this deal came Doogie Howser, M.D. (1989–93) and Cop Rock (1990). The latter combined straight police drama with live-action Broadway singing and dancing, and was one of his highest-profile failures. In 1992, Bochco created an animated television series, Capitol Critters, along with Nat Mauldin and Michael Wagner.

After a lull, Bochco co-created NYPD Blue (1993–2005) with David Milch. Initially controversial at the time, the series was created with the express intention of changing the nature of network one-hour drama to compete with the more adult fare broadcast on cable networks. The spring 1994 television schedule on ABC presented the only run of a television series executive produced by Bochco, The Byrds of Paradise. The Byrds of Paradise showcased a plot structure that was an early forerunner in presenting a more realistic, and not idealized, representation of character development in the primetime television format, but it aired for only one season, and has yet to be re-aired on television. Although The Byrds of Paradise achieved significant critical acclaim during its initial run, and helped launch the careers of actors Seth Green and Jennifer Love Hewitt, the show has never received an official release on any Home video format or Streaming media platform. Other projects in this period that failed to take off include Murder One (1995–97), Brooklyn South (1997), City of Angels (2000), Philly (2001), and Over There (2005). All five shows failed to match Bochco's earlier success though Murder One and Over There garnered critical praise. In 1995, he had a contract with CBS to air the network's future programs, and had to distribute the shows worldwide. In 1999, he moved gears to Paramount Television where he remained until 2005. Shortly afterwards, he was moved to ABC's corporate subsidiary Touchstone Television later in 2005.

In 2005, Bochco took charge of Commander in Chief (2005–06), created by Rod Lurie, and brought in a new writing team. However, in spring 2006, he left the show because of conflicts with ABC, and shortly afterward the program was canceled. Bochco described his experience on the show as "horrible". In 2006 Bochco produced a pilot for an ABC show, Hollis & Rae, and was reported at the same time to be developing a baseball drama and another legal drama for ABC in partnership with Chris Gerolmo.

It was announced in March 2007 that Bochco had taken his first steps into internet TV with the 44-episode Cafe Confidential, each episode being 60-seconds of unscripted "confessions" by members of the public. Yet another legal drama titled Raising the Bar was produced for TNT, this time in partnership with David Feige, although it was cancelled in December 2009 during the second season.

According to an interview with Bochco published in September 2007, he was winding down his involvement with network television, feeling that his tastes and current fashions in TV drama no longer coincide. "The network executives stay the same age and I keep getting older and it creates a different kind of relationship. When I was doing my stuff at NBC with Brandon [Tartikoff] and Hill Street, we were contemporaries," says Bochco. "When I sit down [now], they're sitting in a room with someone who's old enough to be their father and I'm not sure they want to sit in a room with their fathers."

In 2008, Bochco argued that the new home for quality prime time drama is cable, where "the atmosphere is far friendlier and the creative environment more conducive to doing original work", and that "most of what's passing for primetime drama these days isn't very good".

Prior to Hill Street Blues it was rare for American straight drama series to have story arcs, i.e. several stories running over many episodes (with the exception of prime time soap operas such as Dallas). It was also rare to have a large regular cast. The structure of the modern "ensemble" television drama can be traced to Bochco, who many regard as having changed the "language" of television drama.

From 2014 to its cancellation in 2016, he wrote and executive produced Murder in the First, a series drama which he co-created with Eric Lodal.

Personal life
Bochco was married three times: to Gabrielle Levin from 1964 to their divorce in 1969, to actress Barbara Bosson from 1970 to their divorce in 1997, and to television producer and executive Dayna Kalins from 2000 until his death. Bochco had three children. His son, Jesse Bochco, with Bosson, is a producer/director who directed several episodes of his father's shows, including NYPD Blue, Philly, and Over There. As a child, son Jesse played the son of his real mother's character on one episode of Hill Street Blues. 

At the time of his death, Bochco lived in the Pacific Palisades neighborhood of Los Angeles.

Health and death
Bochco was diagnosed with leukemia in 2014, requiring a bone marrow transplant later that year. He died from the disease at his home on April 1, 2018, at age 74.

Awards

Emmy Awards
34 nominations, with 10 wins:
1981 Outstanding Drama Series, for Hill Street Blues
1981 Outstanding Writing in a Drama Series, for Hill Street Blues, "Hill Street Station" (premiere episode)
1982 Outstanding Drama Series, for Hill Street Blues
1982 Outstanding Writing in a Drama Series, for Hill Street Blues, "Freedom's Last Stand"
1983 Outstanding Drama Series, for Hill Street Blues
1984 Outstanding Drama Series, for Hill Street Blues
1987 Outstanding Drama Series, for L.A. Law
1987 Outstanding Writing in a Drama Series, for L.A. Law, "The Venus Butterfly"
1989 Outstanding Drama Series, for L.A. Law
1995 Outstanding Drama Series, for NYPD Blue

Humanitas Prize
Four nominations, with two wins:
1981 60-Minute Category, for Hill Street Blues
1999 90-Minute Category, for NYPD Blue

Edgar Awards
Seven nominations, with two wins:
1982 Best Episode in a TV Series Teleplay, for Hill Street Blues, "Hill Street Station"
1995 Best Episode in a TV Series Teleplay, for NYPD Blue, "Simone Says"

Directors Guild of America
1999 Diversity Award

Producers Guild of America Awards
One nomination/win:
1994 Outstanding Producer of Television, for NYPD Blue
In addition:
1999 Lifetime Achievement Award

Writers Guild of America
13 nominations, with two wins:
1982 Best Writing for an Episodic Drama, for Hill Street Blues, "Hill Street Station"
1985 Best Writing in for  Episodic Drama, for Hill Street Blues, "Grace Under Pressure"
In addition:
1994 Laurel Award for TV Writing Achievement

Peabody Awards
1981 for Hill Street Blues
1987 for L.A. Law
1996 for NYPD Blue
1998 for NYPD Blue, the episode "Raging Bulls"

In addition to these awards, Bochco has earned induction into the Television Hall of Fame, which he achieved in 1996.

Bibliography
 Death by Hollywood: A Novel (2003). New York: Random House. .
 Truth is a Total Defense: My Fifty Years in Television (2016). CreateSpace Independent Publishing Platform. .

Notes

References

External links

Biography at Museum TV 
 

1943 births
2018 deaths
20th-century American male writers
20th-century American screenwriters
21st-century American male writers
21st-century American screenwriters
American entertainment industry businesspeople
American male television writers
American people of Polish-Jewish descent
American television writers
BAFTA fellows
Carnegie Mellon University College of Fine Arts alumni
Deaths from cancer in California
Deaths from leukemia
Edgar Award winners
Jewish American writers
People from Pacific Palisades, California
Primetime Emmy Award winners
Screenwriters from New York (state)
Showrunners
Television producers from New York City
The High School of Music & Art alumni
Writers Guild of America Award winners
Writers from Manhattan